The 1997–98 San Jose Sharks season was the Sharks' seventh season of operation in the National Hockey League (NHL). Following their second last-place finish in as many years, the Sharks unceremoniously fired first-year head coach Al Sims; he was replaced by Darryl Sutter, who had previously coached the Chicago Blackhawks. At the time of his hiring, Sutter was the first head coach in franchise history to have previously coached another NHL team.

The Sharks' coaching switch was accompanied by a handful of player acquisitions and debuts. Of these, the addition of five-time NHL All-Star goaltender Mike Vernon proved most important. On August 18th, 1997, the Sharks acquired Vernon from the Detroit Red Wings for a pair of second-round picks; at the time of the trade, Vernon was only two months removed from backstopping the Red Wings to victory in the 1997 Stanley Cup Finals. Additionally, the Sharks drafted highly-touted forward Patrick Marleau with the second overall pick in the 1997 NHL Entry Draft. Despite a lackluster rookie season, Marleau would enjoy considerable success with the Sharks over the following two decades. Lastly, 1996 first-found pick Marco Sturm was added to the roster early in the season. Sturm and Marleau, in particular, supplemented a burgeoning collection of young forwards that already included mainstays Jeff Friesen and Owen Nolan.

In Sutter's first season at the helm, the Sharks' play improved substantially. While they once again failed to post a winning record, the team managed to clinch the Western Conference's eighth (and final) playoff berth. In the first round of the 1998 Stanley Cup Playoffs, the Sharks faced the top-seeded Dallas Stars. The Sharks quickly dropped their first two games in Dallas; upon returning to San Jose, however, the Sharks rallied to tie the series at two games apiece. An upset was not to be, however, as the Stars responded with a pair of one-goal victories to win the series in six games. Despite a quick exit from the playoffs, the 1997-98 season would prove to be a turning point for the franchise. After finishing with the Western Conference's worst record in four of their first six seasons of play, the Sharks would miss the postseason just twice between 1998 and 2019.

Offseason

Regular season
Captain Todd Gill was traded to the St. Louis Blues, in March.

Final standings

Schedule and results

Playoffs
In a Conference Quarterfinals series, the Sharks met the #1 seeded and Presidents' Trophy-winning Dallas Stars. The Sharks were eliminated by the Stars in six games.

Player statistics

Note: Pos = Position; GP = Games played; G = Goals; A = Assists; Pts = Points; +/- = plus/minus; PIM = Penalty minutes; PPG = Power-play goals; SHG = Short-handed goals; GWG = Game-winning goals
      MIN = Minutes played; W = Wins; L = Losses; T = Ties; GA = Goals-against; GAA = Goals-against average; SO = Shutouts; SA = Shots against; SV = Shots saved; SV% = Save percentage;

Awards and records

Transactions

Draft picks

See also
1997–98 NHL season

References

S
S
San Jose Sharks seasons
San Jose Sharks
San Jose Sharks